Stanley Anthony Woods (born October 11, 1965) is a former professional American football linebacker and defensive end in the National Football League (NFL) who played for the Seattle Seahawks from 1987 to 1992, as well as the Los Angeles Rams and the Washington Redskins. He played college football at the University of Pittsburgh.

Early life
Woods was born in Newark, New Jersey and played high school football at Seton Hall Preparatory School.  While at Seton Hall, he was first-team All-State, first-team Parade All-American and first-team All-USA Today All-American his senior year.  He played in two consecutive state football championship games, and his junior year team was undefeated (11-0), and ranked third in the state.

College career
Woods attended and played college football at the University of Pittsburgh.  As a senior, he had 109 tackles, including 18 tackles against Rutgers University.  He finished his career as a second-team All-American with 242 tackles and 31 sacks.

Professional career

USFL
Woods has the distinction of being the last player ever drafted by the United States Football League.  With one year of college eligibility remaining, he was selected 92nd by the Houston Gamblers in the 12th round of the 1986 USFL Draft.

NFL
Woods was drafted with the 18th overall pick in the 1987 NFL Draft by the Seattle Seahawks, and was the first ever New Jersey football player to be taken in the first round of the NFL draft. In , he was cut by the Seahawks at the end of training camp and signed with the Los Angeles Rams, where he played for one season. Woods then signed with the Washington Redskins, where he finished his career.

Personal life
After retiring, Woods became a football coach.  He was defensive coordinator on the first state football championship team at West Side High School in 2007. He then spent time as the defensive line coach at William Paterson University. He is currently an assistant coach at Seton Hall Prep in West Orange, where he attended high school.

References

External links
 

1965 births
Living people
All-American college football players
American football linebackers
Los Angeles Rams players
Pittsburgh Panthers football players
Seattle Seahawks players
Seton Hall Preparatory School alumni
Washington Redskins players
Players of American football from Newark, New Jersey